Hedda Hosås (born 2 March 2001) is a rallycross driver from Norway who currently races for JBXE in the Extreme E Championship.

Biography

Early career
Having initially started in motocross at the age of 15, Hosås got into car racing a year later when her dad introduced her to it. She ended up preferring the latter, but difficulties with budget and facilities led to her working as a mechanic to fund her career and travelling large distances only to train. With help from local sponsors and the mentorship of FIA World Rallycross Championship driver Ulrik Linnemann, she went to Denmark to race and test, where she caught the eye of Veloce Racing team manager Ian Davies, who signed her as the team's reserve driver for the 2021 Extreme E Championship.

Breakthrough in Extreme E
Hosås was later named as the championship's reserve driver for the 2022 season-opening Desert X-Prix after usual reserve Tamara Molinaro was drafted in to race for Xite Energy Racing. Hosås herself ended up making her debut in the same event as a replacement for Veloce's Christine GZ, who injured herself in Q1. Partnering South African Lance Woolridge, they finished fourth in the crazy race and placed 10th overall. In July she was called up by Jenson Button's JBXE team for the following round in Sardinia, making up the youngest lineup in the grid with Kevin Hansen. The pair made it through to the final and later picked up a podium on their first race together, with third place at the Island X-Prix after a penalty for on-track winners Rosberg X Racing. Hosås would see out the season with JBXE, first alongside Hansen and later with Fraser McConnell, and eventually finished 12th in the drivers' championship.

Hosås remained with JBXE for the 2023 season, being paired with Formula One race winner Heikki Kovalainen.

Racing record

Complete Extreme E results
(key)

References

Living people
2001 births
People from Voss
Norwegian rally drivers
Extreme E drivers
Female rally drivers
Norwegian female racing drivers